Richard Ruíz (born 14 January 1986) is a Mexican professional footballer who plays as a midfielder for Chapulineros de Oaxaca.

Club career

Club Tijuana
In 2009, Ruíz started playing for the Club Tijuana Xoloitzcuintles De Caliente. In 2010, he helped Tijuana obtain the Apertura 2010 champions. Then on 21 May 2011, his team advanced to the Primera División.

Cruz Azul
On 10 June 2015 it was confirmed Ruiz would join the club from Tijuana on a definite purchase.

Tiburones Rojos de Veracruz

On 7 June 2017 it was confirmed Richard Ruiz would join the club from Cruz Azul on a definite purchase.

Toluca

On 7 June 2018, After Toluca failed to come to an agreement with Club Leon for Leonel Lopez, Richard Ruiz was signed as a replacement for Lopez.

Honours

Club
Tijuana

Chapulineros de Oaxaca
 Liga de Balompié Mexicano: 2020–21, 2021

References

External links

1986 births
Living people
Association football defenders
Club Tijuana footballers
Cruz Azul footballers
C.D. Veracruz footballers
Liga MX players
Footballers from Chiapas
Mexican footballers
Ascenso MX players
People from Jiquipilas
Liga de Balompié Mexicano players